Thalassoma is a genus of wrasses native to the Atlantic, Indian and Pacific Oceans. Many species occasionally make their way into the aquarium trade.

Species
The currently recognized species in this genus are:
 Thalassoma amblycephalum (Bleeker, 1856) (blunt-headed wrasse)
 Thalassoma ascensionis (Quoy & Gaimard, 1834) (Ascension wrasse)
 Thalassoma ballieui (Vaillant & Sauvage, 1875) (blacktail wrasse)
 Thalassoma bifasciatum (Bloch, 1791) (bluehead wrasse)
 Thalassoma cupido (Temminck & Schlegel, 1845) (Cupid wrasse)
 Thalassoma duperrey (Quoy & Gaimard, 1824) (saddle wrasse)
 Thalassoma genivittatum (Valenciennes, 1839) (red-cheek wrasse)
 Thalassoma grammaticum C. H. Gilbert, 1890 (sunset wrasse)
 Thalassoma hardwicke (J. W. Bennett, 1830) (sixbar wrasse)
 Thalassoma hebraicum (Lacépède, 1801) (goldbar wrasse)
 Thalassoma heiseri J. E. Randall & A. J. Edwards, 1984 (Pitcairn rainbow wrasse)
 Thalassoma jansenii (Bleeker, 1856) (Jansen's wrasse)
 Thalassoma loxum J. E. Randall & Mee, 1994 (Oman wrasse)
 Thalassoma lucasanum (T. N. Gill, 1862) (Cortez rainbow wrasse)
 Thalassoma lunare (Linnaeus, 1758) (moon wrasse)
 Thalassoma lutescens (Lay & E. T. Bennett, 1839) (yellow-brown wrasse)
 Thalassoma newtoni (Osório, 1891) (Newton's wrasse)
 Thalassoma nigrofasciatum J. E. Randall, 2003 (black-barred wrasse)
 Thalassoma noronhanum (Boulenger, 1890) (Noronha wrasse)
 Thalassoma pavo (Linnaeus, 1758) (ornate wrasse)
 Thalassoma purpureum (Forsskål, 1775) (surge wrasse)
 Thalassoma quinquevittatum (Lay & E. T. Bennett, 1839) (fivestripe wrasse)
 Thalassoma robertsoni G. R. Allen, 1995 (Robertson's rainbow wrasse)
 Thalassoma rueppellii (Klunzinger, 1871) (Klunzinger's wrasse)
 Thalassoma sanctaehelenae (Valenciennes, 1839) (St. Helena wrasse)
 Thalassoma septemfasciata T. D. Scott, 1959 (Seven-banded wrasse)
 Thalassoma trilobatum (Lacépède, 1801) (Christmas wrasse)
 Thalassoma virens C. H. Gilbert, 1890 (Eastern Pacific emerald wrasse)

References

 
Marine fish genera
Taxa named by William John Swainson